Jingui Yaolüe, Essential Prescriptions from the Golden Cabinet  is a classic clinical book of traditional Chinese medicine written by Zhang Zhongjing (150-219) at the end of the Eastern Han dynasty and was first published in the Northern Song dynasty.  The oldest known extant copy, believed to be bibliographically closest to the original, dates to 1340 and was printed with woodcuts in the early Ming dynasty.

There is an annotated English translation by Luo Xiwen, with three hundred modern case histories titled: Synopsis of Prescriptions of the Golden Chamber with 300 Cases. First published in 1995 by New World Press.

References

External links
 Chinese source text

Chinese medical texts
Han dynasty texts